The 1st. Slovak National Hockey League was, along with the 1st. Czech National Hockey League, the second level of ice hockey in Czechoslovakia from 1969 to 1993. The league was made up only of Slovak teams.

History
The precursor to the league was the Group D of the Czechoslovak 2. Liga, which consisted only of Slovak teams. In 1969, two individual leagues were created, the 1. CNHL, and the 1. SNHL.

Champions
Group D 
 1964 – Dukla Košice
 1965 – Jednota Žilina
 1966 – Dukla Trenčín
 1967 – Dukla Nitra
 1968 – Dukla Trenčín
 1969 – Iskra Smrečina Banská Bystrica

1. SNHL

1969–70 – Lokomotíva Vagónka Stavbár Poprad
1970–71 – Dukla Trenčín
1971–72 – ŠK Liptovský Mikuláš
1972–73 – Lokomotíva Bučina Zvolen
1973–74 – ŠK Liptovský Mikuláš
1974–75 – Lokomotíva Bučina Zvolen
1975–76 – Lokomotíva Bučina Zvolen
1976–77 – Dukla Trenčín
1977–78 – Lokomotíva Bučina Zvolen
1978–79 – Spartak ZŤS Dubnica nad Váhom
1979–80 – Spartak ZŤS Dubnica nad Váhom
1980–81 – PS Poprad

1981–82 – Slovan ChZJD Bratislava
1982–83 – Dukla Trenčín
1983–84 – Plastika Nitra
1984–85 – PS Poprad
1985–86 – VTJ Michalovce
1986–87 – Plastika Nitra
1987–88 – Plastika Nitra
1988–89 – Partizán Liptovský Mikuláš
1989–90 – Slovan Bratislava
1990–91 – ŠKP PS Poprad
1991–92 – AC Nitra
1992–93 – AC Nitra

External links
History of Czechoslovak hockey
League results

  
2
Slov
Sports leagues established in 1969
1969 establishments in Czechoslovakia
1993 disestablishments in Slovakia
Slov